Choeradodis columbica, or Columbian shield mantis, is a species of praying mantis native to Colombia.

See also
List of mantis genera and species

References

Mantidae
Mantodea of South America
Endemic fauna of Colombia
Arthropods of Colombia
Insects described in 1813